James Johnson (born 21 May 1982) is an Australian sports administrator and business person who has served as CEO of Football Australia since January 2020. He is also a non-executive advisory board member of the Association Football Development Program Global chaired by Prince Ali bin Hussein of Jordan. Johnson has spent the bulk of his career in the global sports industry and is a highly regarded global sports executive. Johnson has been a featured speaker at sports forums and conferences in areas, including, the international transfer system, financial fair play, multi-club ownership, salary caps, as well as the globalisation, commercialisation, and business of sports. Johnson spent the early period of his career as a lawyer practicing in the areas corporate law, litigation, and industrial relations.

Under his leadership, Australian football has experienced a commercial resurgence having secured broadcast deals with Network 10, ViacomCBS and Fox Sports, as well as sponsorship deals with Commonwealth Bank Australia, Cadbury and Rebel Sport. During Johnson’s tenure, the Australian game has gone through a major governance transformation with the A-League (top-tier Australian professional football league) being separated from Football Australia. Johnson is well known for his role in securing Australia and New Zealand’s hosting rights for the 2023 FIFA Women’s World Cup.

Early life and education
Johnson was born in England to Australian parents who were working in the country. His parents returned to Australia when Johnson was six months old and he grew up in Rockhampton. At the age of 13, his family moved to Brisbane. He has a degree in business administration, minoring in finance, as well as a Juris Doctor in law. Johnson pursued his undergraduate degree at Boston University in Business and Finance. He then studied law at Bond University and graduated with Honours as Juris Doctor.

Playing career
Johnson was a youth international soccer player for the Australia national under-17 soccer team. He was selected in the Australia squad for the 1999 FIFA U-17 World Championship but was cut ahead of the tournament due to injury. Between 2002 and 2005, Johnson played for Boston University Terriers, scoring 13 times in 57 matches. He continued playing at club level until 2007 for Brisbane Strikers and Danang FC.

Working life
After his retirement, Johnson began his legal career practicing in the areas of corporate law, litigation, and industrial relations. Johnson then joined Professional Footballers Australia (PFA). Johnson worked for two years at this organization as a player relations executive. In 2011, Johnson was appointed as the director of international relations and development at The Asian Football Confederation in Malaysia. In 2013, Johnson moved to Zurich and joined FIFA as a senior manager of member associations. After serving for two years on this post, Johnson was appointed as the head of professional football in 2015. He worked until 2018 at this position. After his exit from FIFA, Johnson joined the City Football Group in the UK as a senior vice president of external affairs. In 2020, Johnson became the CEO of the Football Federation Australia.

Organisations
Asian Football Confederation 
FIFA
City Football Group / Manchester City Football Club

CEO, Football Australia (2020 - present) 

 Secured hosting rights for the FIFA Women’s World Cup 2023 
 Negotiated record broadcast agreements with Foxtel, ViacomCBS, Paramount and Channel 10
 Negotiated record sponsorship agreements with Commonwealth Bank Australia, Rebel Sport, Priceline and Cadbury
 Negotiated the restructure and creation of the Australian Professional Leagues (separate professional league from Football Australia) 
 Doubled revenues of Football Australia in first 2 years 
 Oversaw implementation of high-performance review of national team programs 
 Established and articulated 15-year Vision for Australian football and since led transformation of the sport (XI Principles For The Future of Australian Football | Football Australia)

Vision 
Johnson has been labelled as the “visionary guiding soccer’s revolution”. Under his leadership, Football Australia has developed and articulated a vision for the sport called the ‘XI Principles for the future of Australian football’. This Vision was created following a rigorous and collaborative consultation with the national football family.

Sponsorship 
Growing sponsorship revenues has been a hallmark of Johnson's stewardship of Australian football. Johnson secured landmark multi-million-dollar sponsorship deals with Commonwealth Bank Australia for the naming rights for the Matildas and Priceline. In addition, major brands such as Rebel Sports, Cadbury and Pantene have signed sponsorship renewals.

Broadcast 
Johnson leads the strategy and negotiations for Football Australia’s broadcast rights. In 2020, Johnson secured a 1-year deal for the A-League with Fox Sports in what was described as a “game of chicken” allowing the league to resume a season postponed due to the pandemic. Johnson has focused on growing the brands of Australia’s Socceroos and Matildas in Australia and abroad, which led to a landmark broadcast deal with Network 10 and ViacomCBS reportedly worth 100M AUD.

FIFA 2023 Women’s World Cup 
On 25 June 2020, Australia together with New Zealand won the bid to host the 2023 Women's World Cup.  In what has been described as the “whatsapp world cup bid”, Johnson’s network’s and political manoeuvring played a vital role in the successful bid and aligning the voting regions of Africa, Asia, Oceania, North and Central America and the Caribbean. The Australia and New Zealand bid won with 22 votes, while Colombia earned 13. Johnson later publicly criticised the English FA for voting against Australia and New Zealand labelling it “disrespectful”.

Club Football 
Johnson advocated for a governance overhaul of Australia’s A-League from his first day in the office wanting to give the club’s more autonomy to own and operate the league under the ambit of Football Australia. On 31 December 2020, Johnson announced together with A-League Club Chairman Paul Lederer that Football Australia and the A-League clubs had agreed upon a new model following years of negotiations. The model provided the operational, commercial and marketing control of the A-League and regulatory control to Football Australia. Johnson has also focused on growing the brand and relevance of the FFA Cup (Australia’s open club knock-out competition) and has brought in strategic changes, including playing on free to air television and reallocating a slot to the Asian Champions League to the FFA Cup winner. As a next step in the evolution of Australian club football, Johnson has advocated publicly for a second-division club football competition and has set 2023 as the date for it to begin.

Personal life 
Johnson is married with three children and resides in Sydney, Australia.

References

1982 births
English emigrants to Australia
People from Crewe
Boston University alumni
Bond University alumni
People from Rockhampton
People from Brisbane
Australian soccer players
21st-century Australian lawyers
Australian sports executives and administrators
Living people
Brisbane Strikers FC players
Association footballers not categorized by position
Football Australia officials